Mahmood Abad Hoomeh or Mahmudabad-e Humeh may refer to:
 Mahmood Abad Hoomeh, Yazd